The brown tent-making bat (Uroderma magnirostrum) is a bat species from South and Central America.

References

Phyllostomidae
Bats of Central America
Bats of South America
Bats of Brazil
Mammals of Colombia
Mammals described in 1968